The Circle of Palms Plaza is located in downtown San Jose, California. It is composed of a ring of palm trees encircling a California State Seal, and designates the California Historical Marker 461, the site of California's first state capital from 1849-1851.

History
When California became part of the USA in 1850, San Jose was the oldest civilian settlement dating back to its establishment in 1777, and selected the first official state capital of California. A two-story adobe hotel built around 1830 became the first state capitol and hosted the first legislative sessions in 1850 and 1851. This site is now the Circle of Palms Plaza, or California Historical Marker 461.

Description
The Circle of Palms Plaza is a ring of palm trees encircling a California State Seal, located between the Fairmont San Jose Hotel, the KQED building (Silicon Valley Financial Center) and the San Jose Museum of Art.
The concrete around the state seal contains quotes from the 1849 state constitutional convention in Monetery where San Jose was chosen as the capital.

Public activities
Each Winter, the San Jose Downtown Association sets up an outdoor ice rink called "San Jose Downtown Ice" at the Circle of Palms.

Photo gallery

See also 

History of San Jose, California
List of California Historical Landmarks
Chinatown, San Jose, California (the "Plaza Street Chinatown" was located where Circle of Palms Plaza sits today)

References

External links 
Scenes of San Jose: Circle of Palms, photo by Dana Grover
View of the Plaza from above

History of San Jose, California
California Historical Landmarks
Squares and plazas in San Jose
Tourist attractions in San Jose, California